Klaas Gerling (born January 3, 1981), simply known as Klaas, is a German DJ and record producer from Cologne.

Klaas worked under the label Scream & Shout. He has remixed songs for Dimitri Vegas and Like Mike (2016), DJ Antoine, Stromae, Armand Van Helden and Eric Morillo. He is best known for his remix of "Infinity" by Guru Josh, which topped the Belgian chart and peaked at number two on the Dutch chart in 2008. Producing Infinity 2008 (Klaas Vocal Edit) resulted in Gold, Silver, Platinum records in a number of countries and over 100 million views on the official YouTube video. His own release "Our Own Way" reached the top 10 in France in 2009.

As early as 2013, Klaas collaborated with Kim Petras (2023 Grammy-winning singer) on the songs "Heartbeat" and "Flight To Paris".
Since 2016, Klaas has collaborated with Dimitri Vegas and Like Mike and Dimitri Vegas' wife MATTN to produce remakes of past club hits such as "Ocarina", "Cafe Del Mar", "Universal Nation" and Robert Miles' "Children" (2019). Klaas' 2018 single "OK Without You" achieved more than 40 million streams on Spotify. Another of his singles released in 2018, "Close to You", received more than 20 million streams. The collaboration with Londonbeat "I've Been Thinking About You" reached in spring 2019  #1 in the US Billboard Dance Charts. In 2021, Klaas has gained more than 5 million monthly listeners on Spotify. In January 2023, he reached the top 10 of Germany's most-streamed Dance/Electronic artists.

Awards and nominations

Discography

Charted singles

Other singles
2006
Whipe Your Ass
Get Twisted
Confession
2007
The Way
2008
Sexy Girl
How Does It Feel
Make You Feel
Feel the Love
2009
What Is Love (with Haddaway)
Our Own Way
Better Days
2010
Downtown
It's My Day
Freak (with Bodybangers)
2011
I'm Free
I Like (with Bodybangers)
Changes
2012
Do What You Do
Grape
Engelstrommeln
Wild Beast
Andromeda
Pulsar
Proton
Hold This Moment
2013
We Are Free
Hurt Will End
Flight To Paris (featuring Kim Petras)
Storm
Heartbeat (featuring Kim Petras)
2014
Party Like We're Animals
Calavera
Ready
Here We Go
2015
Go For It
Why
Resurrection
Gallery (We Are One)
2016
Far Away (featuring Jelle Van Dael of Lasgo)
Where You At
Feel (feat. Steve Noble)
Hungover By A Dream (feat. Lorela)
2017
Riot
Don't Talk
Together
Cintura
2018
Close To You
Love Your Life
Big Words
Get Down
Ok Without You
2019
Figure Out
Klaas & Londonbeat - I've Been Thinking About You
Don't Wanna Grow Up
Someone Like You
Children (With MATTN & Roland Clark)
Call Me When You Need Me
Over & Done
When We Were Still Young
2021

 Take My Hand (with Freischwimmer, Sary)
 Godzilla
 Second Life

2022

 First Girl On The Moon
 Atlantis
 Fiesta Loca

Remixes

 Chris Burke & Audiosonik - Bad Girl (Klaas Edit) 2021
Dimitri Vegas & Like Mike vs. Quintino - The Chase (Klaas & MATTN remix) 2020
Ulrikke - Attention (Klaas remix) 2020
Magnus - Do Not Cry (Klaas Remix) 2019
Sean Finn X Guru Josh - Infinity 2018 (Klaas Remix) 2018
No More Tears (Klaas Remix) 2018
DJane Housekat - The One (Klaas Remix) 2017
Sweet Dreams (Klaas Remix) 2017
Dimitri Vegas, Mattn, Klaas, Futuristic Polar Bears - Universal Nation 2017
Mazza feat. Tenashar – Found Love (Klaas Remix) 2017
Martin Van Lectro – Never Know (Klaas Remix) 2016
Newclaess – Feel Alive (Klaas Remix) 2016
Mattn & Futuristic Polarbears – Cafe Del Mar 2016 (Dimitri Vegas & Like Mike vs Klaas Remix) 2016
Mazza feat. Ariel Morer – Lift Me Up (Klaas Mix) 2016
Silver Surfer (Klaas Remix) 2016
Ocarina (Klaas & Mazza Remix) 2015
Sean Finn – Explode (Klaas Mix Edit) 2015
Mazza – Summer (Klaas Dub Mix) 2014
Rene Rodrigezz & Dipl. Inch – Only One (Klaas Mix) 2013
Van Snyder & DJ D.M.H - This World (Klaas Remix) 2013
DJ Antoine – To the People (Klaas Remix) 2013
R.I.O. – Ready or Not (Klaas Remix) 2013
Alesha Dixon - Radio (Klaas Remix Feat. Wiley)
Klaas & Bodybangers - I Like
Lou Bega - This is Ska (Klaas Remix)
Klaas & Bodybangers - Freak (Klaas Remix)
Jessy Matador - Bomba (Klaas Mix)
Jessy Matador - Bomba (Klaas Club Mix)
Example - Kickstarts (Klaas Mix)
Stromae - House'llelujah (Klaas Remix)
Menyo - Follow Your Heart (Klaas remix)
Jasper Forks - River Flows In You (Klaas Radio Mix)
Safri Duo - Helele (Klaas Mix)
Culcha Candela – Somma im Kiez (Klaas Remix)
Real2Real – I Like To Move it (Klaas Remix)
Greg Cerrone – Invincible (Klaas Remix)
Attack Attack – Set The Sun (Klaas Remix)
Michael Mind – Ride Like The Wind (Klaas Remix)
Global Deejays – Everybody's Free (Klaas Remix)
Antoine Clamaran & Mario Ochoa – Give Some Love (Klaas Remix)
Micha Moor – Space (Klaas Club Mix)
Micha Moor – Space (Klaas Bigrooom Mix)
Eddie Thoneick – Together As One (Klaas Remix)
Patrick Bryce – Papercut (Klaas & Micha moor Remix)
Chrissi D! – Don't you feel (Klaas Remix)
DJ Aston Martinez – You Wanna (Klaas Remix)
Erik Decks – Wild Obsession Theme (Klaas Remix)
DJ Shumilin - Roller Head (Klaas Remix)
No Angels – Goodbye To Yesterday (Klaas Remix)
DJ Antoine – This Time (Klaas Remix)
Greg Cerrone – Pilling Me (Klaas Remix)
John Morley – Naughty (Klaas Remix)
I'm A Finn Vs Klaas – I Love You (Klaas Remix)
The Freelance Hellraiser – Weightlessness (Klaas Remix)
Lissat & Voltaxx – Young and beautiful (Klaas & Micha Moor Remix)
Spinning Elements – Freak (Klaas Remix)
Dr. Kucho & Gregor Salto – Can't Stop Playing
Fragma – Memory (Klaas Remix)
Danny S – Keep Me Hanging On (Klaas Remix)
Jean Elan – Where's Your Head At (Klaas Remix)
Guru Josh Project – Infinity 2008 (Klaas Remix)
Gala - Freed From Desire 2011 (Klaas Club Mix)
Mylène Farmer - Oui Mais... Non (Klaas Remix)

References

German DJs
Musicians from Cologne
1981 births
Living people
Electronic dance music DJs